Ridgefield station can refer to:

Ridgefield station (Erie Railroad)
Ridgefield station (Hudson–Bergen Light Rail)
Ridgefield station (New York, New Haven, and Hartford Railroad)